Alypia langtoni, the six-spotted forester or Langton's forester, is a moth of the family Noctuidae. The species was first described by William Couper in 1865. It is found in North America from Newfoundland to Alaska, south to Maine and Wisconsin in the east, south in the west to Colorado and California.

Description 

The moth exhibits sexual dimorphism. Males have eight spots in total while females have six. Their bodies are black with white spots on each wing. Their antennae are banded with white rings. The wingspan is about 30 mm. Adults are on wing from May to July in one generation depending on the location. 

The larvae feed on Chamaenerion species such as Fireweed.

References

External links

"Alypia langtoni Couper". Noctuidae of North America. Retrieved November 12, 2020.

Agaristinae
Moths of North America
Moths described in 1865